The Rusca is a right bank, north-flowing tributary of the river Bistrița in Romania. It flows into the Bistrița in the village Rusca. There is another Bistrița tributary named Rusca less than 200 metres upstream, on the opposite bank.

References

Rivers of Romania
Rivers of Suceava County